Rosas del Amor is a 1987 flamenco album, the debut solo album of Spanish guitarist Tomatito.

Track listing
Dedicado a Camarón (3:52) 		
La Chanca (4:03) 			
Rosas del Amor (4:04) 			
La Andonda (3:08) 			
Puerta de Sevilla (3:18) 			
Barrio Santiago (3:47) 			
Alejandría (4:09) 		
Soledad (4:33)

Reception
Richard Nidel considers Rosas del Amor to be an "important, groundbreaking CD."
Stewart Mason of Allmusic says of it, "Rosas del Amor is a legendary album in modern flamenco music; it wouldn't be far off to call it the Spanish folk guitar equivalent of Sgt. Pepper's Lonely Hearts Club Band. Rosas del Amor takes traditional flamenco music and injects liberal amounts of jazz influence, specifically the French gypsy-influenced jazz of Django Reinhardt and Stephane Grappelli. The resulting intermingling of styles works beautifully, as the two forms of music (not as far apart as one might initially think) blend harmoniously into a fully realized, richly textured whole."

References

1987 albums
Flamenco albums
EMI Latin albums